The 1917 All-Ireland Senior Football Championship Final was the thirtieth All-Ireland Final and the deciding match of the 1917 All-Ireland Senior Football Championship, an inter-county Gaelic football tournament for the top teams in Ireland. 

Dual star Turlough "Tull" Considine was through on goal for Clare but was tripped up, while both teams had goals disallowed, so only points decided the game, Wexford winning nine to five.

It was the third of four All-Ireland football titles won by Wexford in the 1910s.

Seán O'Kennedy, whose brother Gus played at corner-forward, captained Wexford.

References

All-Ireland Senior Football Championship Final, 1917
Gaelic football
All-Ireland Senior Football Championship Finals
All-Ireland Senior Football Championship Final
Clare county football team matches
Wexford county football team matches